Carlo Costanzi (1705–1781) was an Italian gem engraver of the late-Baroque period.

He was born to a family of gem-makers and artists in Naples. His father Giovanni and brother Tommaso were also a gem engravers, while his other brother Placido became a painter. Carlo later moved and worked the rest of his life in Rome. He obtained commissions from the major European courts.

References

1705 births
1781 deaths
Artists from Naples
18th-century Italian artists
Engraved gem artists